Cladding is the bonding together of dissimilar metals. It is different from fusion welding or gluing as a method to fasten the metals together. Cladding is often achieved by extruding two metals through a die as well as pressing or rolling sheets together under high pressure.

The United States Mint uses cladding to manufacture coins from different metals. This allows a cheaper metal to be used as a filler. For example, dimes and quarters struck since 1965 have cores made from pure copper, with a clad layer consisting of 75% copper and 25% nickel added during production.

Laser cladding is an additive manufacturing approach for metal coatings or precise piece restorations by using high power multi-mode optical fiber laser.

Roll bonding 

In roll bonding, two or more layers of different metals are thoroughly cleaned and passed through a pair of rollers under sufficient pressure to bond the layers. The pressure is high enough to deform the metals and reduce the combined thickness of the clad material. Heat may be applied, especially when metals are not ductile enough. As an example of application, bonding of the sheets can be controlled by painting a pattern on one sheet; only the bare metal surfaces bond, and the un-bonded portion can be inflated if the sheet is heated and the coating vaporizes. This is used to make heat exchangers for refrigeration equipment.

Explosive welding

In explosive welding, the pressure to bond the two layers is provided by detonation of a sheet of chemical explosive. No heat-affected zone is produced in the bond between metals.  The explosion propagates across the sheet, which tends to expel impurities and oxides from between the sheets.  Pieces up to 4 x 16 metres can be manufactured.  The process is useful for cladding metal sheets with a corrosion-resistant layer.

Laser cladding

Laser cladding is a method of depositing material by which a powdered or wire feedstock material is melted and consolidated by use of a laser in order to coat part of a substrate or fabricate a near-net shape part (additive manufacturing technology) .

It is often used to improve mechanical properties or increase corrosion resistance, repair worn out parts, and fabricate metal matrix composites.  Surface material may be laser cladded directly onto a highly stressed component, i.e. to make a self-lubricating surface. However, such a modification requires further industrialization of the cladding process to adapt it for efficient mass production. Further research on the detailed effects from surface topography, material composition of the laser cladded material and the composition of the additive package in the lubricants on the tribological properties and performance are preferably studied with tribometric testing.

Process
A laser is used to melt metallic powder dropped on a substrate to be coated. The melted metal forms a pool on the substrate;  moving the substrate allows the melt pool to solidify in a track of solid metal.  Some processes involve moving the laser and powder nozzle assembly over a stationary substrate to produce solidified tracks.  The motion of the substrate is guided by a CAM system which interpolates solid objects into a set of tracks, thus producing the desired part at the end of the trajectory.

Automatic laser cladding machines are the subject of ongoing research and development.  Many of the process parameters must be manually set, such as laser power, laser focal point, substrate velocity, powder injection rate, etc., and thus require the attention of a specialized technician to ensure proper results.  By use of sensors to monitor the deposited track height and width, metallurgical properties , and temperature, constant observation from a technician is no longer required to produce a final product.  Further research has been directed to forward processing where system parameters are developed around specific metallurgical properties for user defined applications (such as microstructure, internal stresses, dilution zone gradients, and clad contact angle).

Advantages 
 Best technique for coating any shape => increase life-time of wearing parts.
 Particular dispositions for repairing parts (ideal if the mould of the part no longer exist or too long time needed for a new fabrication).
 Most suited technique for graded material application.
 Well adapted for near-net-shape manufacturing.
 Low dilution between track and substrate (unlike other welding processes and strong metallurgical bond.
 Low deformation of the substrate and small heat affected zone (HAZ).
 High cooling rate => fine microstructure.
 A lot of material flexibility (metal, ceramic, even polymer).
 Built part is free of crack and porosity.
 Compact technology.

See also
 Additive manufacturing
 All-Clad
 Copper-clad aluminum wire
 Copper-clad steel
 Goldbeating

References

External links

Laser applications
Metalworking